NVPI (Nederlandse Vereniging van Producenten en Importeurs van beeld - en geluidsdragers) is the Dutch trade association of the entertainment industry. The NVPI represents most of the Dutch record companies, video distributors and game-software distributors.

History
The NVPI is found in 1973 as a representative of the record companies in the Netherlands. In 1983 video film distributors were included in the association and in 1996 the producers of entertainment software. Every division has got its own board. The three divisions form a federation. The NVPI represents both major and small independent producers. The (board) structure guarantees influence by every included company.

The NVPI represents (looked at the total volume of trade) approximately 85% of the record companies, 80% of the video film companies and 50% of the entertainment software. NVPI is included with the international organization IFPI (International Federation of the Phonographic Industry), IVF (International Video Federation) and the ISFE (Interactive Software Federation Europe).

Core branches
The core branches of NVPI are:
 Lobbying
 Announcements to the press and others
 Market investigation
 Representation in consultative bodies
 Distribution of Home copying compensation to audio producers
 Cultural/social activities
 Information to its members

Certifications
NVPI gives certifications to albums, singles, games and DVD of both music recordings and movies. Certifications for music recordings began in 1978. Separate scales are used for music in the classical, jazz and world music genre. The following levels were used over the years:

Popular albums

Classical albums
Includes jazz and world music.

Singles

DVDs

Entertainment software
Games are certified separately for each gaming carrier (PlayStation/Xbox/GameCube/Nintendo/PC).

Charts

NVPI works with two different chart organizations in the Netherlands. Those are the Dutch Top 40 (a weekly singles chart including downloads, single sales and radio airplay) and MegaCharts (weekly charts of the Album Top 100, Single Top 100, Music DVD Top 30 and several others).

See also 
 IFPI

References

External links 
 

Music industry associations
Organizations established in 1973
Arts and media trade groups
Music organisations based in the Netherlands
1973 establishments in the Netherlands